The decade of the 1610s in archaeology involved some significant events, some of which are described here.

Finds
 1613: Remains of the Temple of Proserpina were unearthed in Mtarfa, Malta. Most of the marble blocks were later sculpted into decorative elements for new buildings.
 1614: Tomb of the Scipios discovered in Rome. The titulus of L. Cornelius is published in 1617 by Giacomo Sirmondo in Antiquae inscriptionis, qua L. Scipionis Barbati, filii expressum est elogium, explanatio.

Births

Deaths

References

Archaeology by decade
Archaeology